Huiramba is a municipality of Michoacán. The central settlement is also called Huiramba, and the municipality includes the localities El Pedregal, El Refugio, El Sauz, La Presa, La Reunión, Las Trojes, Los Cerritos and Tupátaro.

References

Municipalities of Michoacán